Founded in 1990, Meritas is a professional services network consisting of a global alliance of business law firms formerly known as Commercial Law Affiliates.  In 2019, the association's membership included over 190 law firms in 97 countries, with more than 7500 lawyers worldwide. Meritas is a non-profit corporation headquartered in Minneapolis, Minnesota. Membership is extended by invitation only, and regular recertification by all firms every three years is a requirement of membership.  There is a staff of about 15 who handle the organization's administration and review referrals to ensure that the organization's standards are maintained.

Membership

Jennifer McPhee, writing for Canadian Lawyer, described Meritas as one of the "more established by-invitation only legal networks that do extensive research before carefully selecting one firm per jurisdiction." Corporate Counsel Weekly also wrote, "Meritas determines significant business or economic centers where member firms' clients may need local counsel in order to determine where it will have its members," and that "...all member firms provide Meritas with quarterly referral reports, listing all Meritas-originated referrals made to and from the firm for the stated period and cooperate in evaluating specific matters." If a firm does not receive good marks, its membership with the organization may be terminated.

Officers

 May 1998: Jerome Reso (Baldwin Haspel Burke & Mayer, LLC - New Orleans, LA, USA) named as Meritas Chair
 May 2001: George Cadman (Boughton Law Corporation - Vancouver, BC, Canada) named as Chair
 May 2005: A. Lee Lundy (Tydings & Rosenberg LLP - Baltimore, Maryland, USA) named as Chair
 February 2006: Tanna Moore named President and CEO
 May 2007 Kenneth Kallish (Minden Gross LLP - Toronto, ON, Canada) named as Meritas Chair
 July 2008: Jean-Paul Bignon named as Chair-elect
 April 2009: Jean-Paul Bignon (Bignon Lebray - Paris, France) named as Chair
 May 2011: Judith Lockhart (Carter Ledyard & Milburn LLP, New York, NY) named as Chair
 May 2013: Andre Ryan (BCF LLP - Montreal, QC, Canada) named as Chair
 May 2015: Dennis Unkovic (Meyer, Unkovic & Scott - Pittsburgh, PA, United States) named as Chair
 May 2018: Jill Wiley (Waterfall Economidis - Tucson, Arizona, United States) named as Chair
February 2020: Sona Pancholy named President

References

External links
 

Law firms based in Minnesota
International law organizations
1990 establishments in Minnesota